A total lunar eclipse will take place on February 11, 2055.

This eclipse is the third of an almost tetrad, the others being 22 Feb 2054 (T), 18 Aug 2054 (T) and 7 August 2055 (P).

Visibility 

The entire eclipse will be visible from Africa, Europe, and the western half of Asia. Part or most of the eclipse will be visible from the Americas (except for westernmost North America), the eastern half of Asia, and western Australia.

Related lunar eclipses

Tritos series

Inex series

Lunar year series

Tzolkinex 
 Preceded: Lunar eclipse of January 1, 2048

 Followed: Lunar eclipse of March 25, 2062

See also 
List of lunar eclipses and List of 21st-century lunar eclipses

Notes

External links 
 

2055-02
2055-02
2055 in science